The Peruvian small-eared shrew (Cryptotis peruviensis) is a species of mammal in the family Soricidae. The species may also be present in Ecuador. It has the southernmost range of any shrew in South America. (The restricted range of shrews in South America is a reflection of their limited mobility and relatively recent arrival from Central America as part of the Great American Interchange.)

References

Cryptotis
Mammals of Peru
Mammals of the Andes
Mammals described in 1997